Božetice is a municipality and village in Písek District in the South Bohemian Region of the Czech Republic. It has about 300 inhabitants.

Administrative parts
The village of Radihošť is an administrative part of Božetice.

References

Villages in Písek District